1 Memorial Drive is the headquarters complex of the Federal Reserve Bank of Kansas City.

The 618,000 square foot complex consisting of a 14-story tower and two-story base containing its cash processing and operations facilities was designed by Pei Cobb Freed & Partners was dedicated June 11, 2008, and replaced its headquarters at 925 Grand.  Henry N. Cobb was the lead architect.

The complex is located in Penn Valley Park opposite the Liberty Memorial on the site that was the former St. Mary's Hospital where Jo Zach Miller, Jr., president of the bank who oversaw the construction of 925 Grand, had spent his last days.

It was the first Federal Reserve building built after the September 11 attacks prompted increased security at federal buildings.

The complex (which moved from Downtown Kansas City) is in a park setting and its 15.7 acre property was landscaped by Laurie Olin of Olin Associates.

Money Museum
Included in the building is the Money Museum.  Its most prominent exhibit is a 27-pound gold bar valued at $400,000 which visitors are permitted to pick up.

Other exhibits include a 463 piece coin collection on loan from the Truman Library which has coins from every Presidential administration.  The coin collection was originally by Treasury Secretary John Snyder but was stolen in 1962.  Snyder worked to replace it.

The museum also has a window in which visitors can see the movement of cash in and out of its vault.

IOU/USA Sculpture
In 2011 it was the target of numerous demonstrations during the Occupy movement protests.  A 65 foot high sculpture by John Salvest from Arkansas State University was temporarily erected on city property opposite the building that proclaimed "IOU" on one side and "USA" on the other.  The sculpture was built with 117 shipping containers.  It was financed by the Grand Arts, a non profit art museum in the city's Power and Light District.  The Federal Reserve sent bomb sniffing dogs to check the containers during the installation.

References

Federal Reserve Bank of Kansas City
Federal Reserve Bank buildings
Government buildings in Missouri
Skyscraper office buildings in Kansas City, Missouri
Office buildings completed in 2008